Manipulation under anesthesia (MUA) or fibrosis release procedures is a multidisciplinary, chronic pain-related manual therapy modality which is used for the purpose of improving articular and soft tissue movement.  This is accomplished by way of a combination of controlled joint mobilization/manipulation and myofascial release techniques. MUA is used by osteopathic/orthopedic physicians and specially trained (MUA certified) physicians.  It aims to break up adhesions (scar tissue) on or around spinal joints (cervical, thoracic, lumbar, sacral, or pelvic regions) or extremity joints (i.e., knee, shoulder, hip) to which a restricted range of motion can be painful and limit function. Failed attempts at other standard conservative treatment methods (i.e., manipulation, physical therapy, medication), over a sufficient time-frame, is one of the principal patient qualifiers.

Procedure 
In the outpatient ambulatory or hospital-based setting, with a qualified medical physician in attendance, the anesthetic or medication component/s of the spinal MUA procedure may be provided in one of two ways.

Intravenous (IV) infusion 

Historically, the medical literature identifies sodium pentothal as the earliest of the anesthetizing agents used with the MUA procedure. That was followed by a period during which propofol was used to induce a “twilight state” (aka, IV sedation or conscious sedation ). The latter became the doctor-preferred means of rendering the service, as it offered preservation of patient responsiveness during the delivery of treatment. With today's MUA procedure, deep conscious sedation is accomplished with agents such as propofol, through monitored anesthesia care (MAC).

Local injection 

As a less common mode of MUA treatment, select injectable medications can be administered directly into affected synovial joints, spinal facet joints, or into the surrounding epidural space. Local anesthetic injection allows previously incomplete office-based manual therapy methods to be better delivered/tolerated, but outside of the general anesthesia scenario. When rendered to the spine, this variety of MUA procedure is qualified by terms such as manipulation under joint anesthesia (MUJA) and manipulation under epidural anesthesia (MUEA).

History 
Medication Assisted Manipulation (MAM) has been used since the 1930s, and MUA was practiced by osteopathic physicians and orthopedic surgeons in the 1940s and 1950s. It was largely abandoned due to complications from general anesthesia and due to the type of nonspecific manipulation procedures used. It was modified and revived in the 1990s, primarily by chiropractors, and also by osteopathic physicians; this was likely due to safer anesthesia used for conscious sedation, along with increased interest in spinal manipulation (SM).

In the MUA literature, spinal manipulation under anesthesia has been described as a controversial procedure. It has had a history susceptible to enthusiastic claims of success and indiscriminate use.  With continued misperceptions about the findings and significance of primary research, similar issues remain today.  An example of this is seen in endorsements for MUA that inaccurately cite study outcomes and/or focus on selective information which places the procedure, and the practice of multiple day applications, in a more favorable light.  The table that follows provides detail concerning this phenomenon.

Some historical misperceptions about the findings of spinal MUA research

State of evidence

Spinal MUA 
Since the 1930s, spinal manipulation under anesthesia has been reported in the published medical literature.  Within the existing base of studies is some reports of positive results.  However, it appears that as part of the evolution of the procedure, the medical literature reveals many variations in [A] the type of sedatives/medications used, [B] manipulation technique, [C] the number of MUA sessions employed, [D] the span of time between procedure doses (if administered in series), and [E] the types and breadth of application of post-MUA adjunctive and/or rehabilitative measures.
 
There has been and remains a strong theoretical basis for spinal MUA.  However, considering the aforementioned differences in existing published studies, field practitioners have not had an objective and uniform means by which to establish evidence-based treatment protocols. Also, because the preponderance of studies is of lower level evidence the issue of long-term effectiveness of MUA in the management of specific spinal conditions has yet to be investigated.  Another area for which basic experimental research is lacking to support the efficacy of MUA treatment of the low back, and other spinal regions, relates to the two presiding theories that [A] flexibility of the spine may be increased when adhesions are reduced, and [B] MUA is more effective at treating adhesions than office-based manual therapy methods.  Perhaps of greater significance, the circumstances by which or how often spinal adhesions (scar tissue) may form in the general population, in the presence or absence of prior surgery or vertebral fracture, have not been addressed in the medical literature.
 
A 2005 consensus statement from the American Academy of Osteopathy indicates that research and publication is limited for the use and effectiveness of MUA. More recently, it has been reported that there are gaps in the medical literature for spinal MUA in the areas of patient selection and treatment protocols.  On account of that, a Delphi process was undertaken to develop evidence-informed and consensus-based guidelines for the chiropractic profession.  The outcome of that process offers direction to MUA practitioners and facilities, although not intended for individual patients.

Notably, the criteria recommended by members of the chiropractic profession are distinctly different from the criteria established by the American Academy of Osteopathy. Moreover, the Delphi method is a consensus process which represents consenting opinion from an impaneled group of experts.  But with expert opinion serving as the lowest level of evidence (Level V) in the medical evidence hierarchy, the MUA-related Delphi process publication of 2014 does not enhance the state of the evidence for spinal MUA.  Therefore, the largely anecdotal basis for procedural effectiveness, and continued reliance upon the spinal MUA protocols historically used, are what principally influence the practice of MUA today.
  
In comparison to other available treatment options for chronic spine pain patients, it is the benchmark of the randomized controlled trial that could best define patient candidacy, optimal procedure dosing, and long-term effectiveness for MUA.  Previous MUA investigators have mentioned the use of inconsistent protocols and have called for large-scale MUA studies (randomized trials) for chronic low back pain. To date, no such studies have been undertaken.
     
Due to the lack of high-level research evidence for the long-term clinical efficacy of spinal MUA, several traditional criteria for patient selection are without support or remain unproven.  The most recent analysis of the published medical evidence for MUA shows that disc herniation/protrusion qualifies as at least a relative contraindication, with risk for injury and no proven long-term benefit. Also, in the presence of a positive lumbar EMG study (nerve root compression) with lumbar disc herniation, Level II evidence suggests that patients will eventually need surgical correction. For chronic neck and low back pain patients who also have significant anxiety/stress, Level II evidence suggests that MUA will not be of therapeutic benefit.  Accordingly, most insurance carriers in the United States maintain medical policy which deems the spinal MUA unproven or experimental/investigational.

Extremity joint MUA 
Patients that may qualify for MUA to an extremity joint include those with stiff post-operative knee joints that have undergone total knee replacement (total knee arthroplasty- TKA). Range of motion data taken at discharge following TKA have been suggested as an indicator for MUA, when falling short of the “optimal zone” of ≥70˚ flexion combined with an extension deficit of ≤10˚.  It appears that the ideal period for applying manipulation to knee stiffness after TKA is at less than 20 weeks from primary surgery, with no added benefit reported from re-manipulations. Similarly, another recent study also found that MUA is useful for decreased range of motion but the success rate of repeated MUA was less than that of the primary dose.

Outside of the above clinical scenario and related research, the supportive evidence for MUA to other extremity joints is weak, inconclusive or non-existent.  The shoulder, when failing to achieve flexibility following standard treatment, is one of the extremity regions for which the frozen shoulder condition has traditionally been cited as an indication for MUA.  There are some supportive studies in this area, including one showing that patients fare better with intervention at 6 and 9 months after condition onset (having significantly better abduction and external rotation, with less pain at rest and at night).  However, for those studies which represent the highest level of research evidence, the results of two recent systematic reviews for frozen shoulder raise question as to treatment superiority when compared to other forms of treatment.  Namely, in the 2012 systematic review, Maund, et al. found a single adequate study, but no evidence there of better outcome with MUA versus home exercise.  In the 2015 systematic review, Uppal, et al. determined MUA to be equivocal at best, when compared to hydrodilation and steroid injection.

The provision of MUA to an extremity joint is reserved for primary conditions thereof, such as a frozen articulation. The practice of applying MUA to an extremity joint that conjoins the spine (i.e., shoulder and/or hip), as a routine component or an extension of a spinal MUA procedure, is not supported by clinical investigation.

Risk 
Tens of thousands of uneventful spinal and extremity MUA procedures have been performed in the United States over the past several decades. As such, in all likelihood, the risks with the procedure are relatively low or minimized with current techniques and when patients are properly selected and evaluated by the anesthesiologist, the medical physician who is providing medical clearance, and the MUA manual therapy practitioner (DC, DO, MD).  However, as with any procedure, there are inherent risks with MUA. The chiropractic literature seems to best address concern for complications, poor outcomes, or adverse events with spinal MUA.; however, better event reporting is needed in developing more definitive risk criteria. In part, these include severe sacroiliac pain with transient “pain paralysis” (of one or both legs), transient respiratory distress, a significant adverse cardiovascular event, spinal fracture with hemothorax, lower extremity fracture, glenoid fracture, shoulder dislocation, and pseudoaneurysm.

References 

Chiropractic treatment techniques
Manual therapy